Enrique Avellán Ferrés (December 11, 1904 in Guayaquil – 1984 in Quito) was an Ecuadorian novelist and playwright.

He is the author of the novel La enorme pasión (Enormous Passion), the three-act play Como los árboles (1927; Like the Trees), and the musical fantasy La rebelion del museo (1969; Rebellion in the Museum).

He studied at the University of Guayaquil where he earned a degree in social and political sciences.

Awards
Enrique Avellán Ferrés received multiple literary prizes.

In 1927 Avellán Ferrés, Hugo Mayo, and María Luisa Lecaro won the Savia Magazine Poetry Contest in Guayaquil.

Works
 La enorme pasión (Enormous Passion)
 Como los árboles (1927; Like the Trees)
 El mismo caso (1938; The Same Case)
 Sin caminos (1939; Without direction)
 Manos de criminal (1939; Criminal Hands)
 Clarita la negra (1966; Black Clarita)
 Tiempo y ausencia (1969; Time and Absence)
 Correntada (1969; River Current)
 La rebelion del museo (1969; Rebellion in the Museum)
 Teatro para niños (1973; Children's Theater)
 Tablero: cuentos (1941)

References 

1904 births
Ecuadorian dramatists and playwrights
Ecuadorian novelists
People from Guayaquil
University of Guayaquil alumni
1984 deaths
20th-century novelists
20th-century dramatists and playwrights